Grădiştea may refer to:

Grădiștea, Brăila, a commune in Brăila County, Romania
Grădiștea, Călărași, a commune in Călăraşi County, Romania
Grădiștea, Ilfov, a commune in Ilfov County, Romania
Grădiștea, Vâlcea, a commune in Vâlcea County, Romania
Grădiştea, a village in Grecești Commune, Dolj County, Romania
Grădiştea, a village in Comana Commune, Giurgiu County, Romania
Grădiştea, a village in Găneasa Commune, Olt County, Romania
Grădiştea, a village in Boldeşti-Grădiştea Commune, Prahova County, Romania
Grădiştea de Munte, a village in Orăștioara de Sus Commune, Hunedoara County, Romania
Grădişte, the official name until 1941 of Sarmizegetusa Commune, Hunedoara County, Romania

See also
Grădiște River, Romania
Grădinari (disambiguation)
Gradište (disambiguation)
Hradiště (disambiguation)
Grodziszcze (disambiguation)